Richard Thomas Griffiths (7 April 1948 in Isleworth, Middlesex, UK) is an English-Dutch historian.

Early life
Griffiths studied economic history and Russian studies at University College, Swansea and graduated with first class honours in 1970. He was a postgraduate students at Jesus College, Cambridge where he prepared his thesis the apparent stagnation of the Netherlands in the first half of the nineteenth century. He received his PhD in 1977.

Career
He was appointed lecturer in European Studies at the University of Manchester Institute for Science and Technology (now part of Manchester University) in 1973. From 1980 to 1987 he was professor of Social and Economic History at the Free University, Amsterdam. From 1987 to 1995 he held the chair in Contemporary History at the European University Institute (EUI) in Florence where he directed its research project into the History of European Integration. Since 1995 he has been Professor of Economic and Social History at Leiden University where he also directs the MA in European Union Studies. He is currently director of the BA in International Studies, taught at the university’s campus in the Hague. He has been visiting professor at Leuven University (Belgium), Evora University (Portugal), Istanbul Bilgi University (Istanbul, Turkey) and Chulalongkorn University (Bangkok, Thailand).

References

1948 births
Living people
English historians
Academic staff of Leiden University
People from Isleworth